Raúl Jimeno Pérez (born 18 May 1959) is a Spanish athlete. He competed in the men's hammer throw at the 1984 Summer Olympics.

References

External links
 

1959 births
Living people
Athletes (track and field) at the 1984 Summer Olympics
Spanish male hammer throwers
Olympic athletes of Spain
Athletes from Madrid
20th-century Spanish people
21st-century Spanish people